The 2019 Dunlop Endurance Championship is a motor racing championship for GT cars, touring cars, sportscars and Production cars held across England. Cars compete in five classes with a car's class decided on horsepower, momentum, equipment, etc. It was the 17th season of a Britcar championship, the 8th run as the Britcar Endurance Championship and the 4th run as the Dunlop Britcar Endurance Championship. The championship changed back to 60-minute races for 2019.: The season began on 30 March at Silverstone and ended on 10 November at Brands Hatch. 

Dunlop supplied tyres for every team at all events throughout the year.

The Class 1 championship title was won by Tim Gray, Alistair Boulton and Grant Williams, Paul Bailey and Andy Schulz were the Class 2 champions, the Class 3 champions were Mark and Peter Cunningham, Tim Docker won the Class 4 championship title and Class 5 was won by Chris Murphy. The overall championship was sealed by Paul Bailey and Andy Schulz, who were 34 points ahead of Tim Docker.

The season also saw the entry and marked the racing debut of the Brabham BT62.

Calendar
 Each race, 1-hour or 2-hours, would consist of one mandatory pit stop and driver change

Teams and drivers
Cars are assigned classed based on speed, horsepower, momentum, equipment fitted to the car and the car's model;
Class 1: GT3, prototype cars
Class 2: GT4, cup (one-make series) cars
Class 3: Cup (one-make series) cars
Class 4: GT4, cup and TCR cars
Class 5: Production cars

Results

Overall championship standings 

Points are awarded as follows in all classes:

(key)

Class championship standings 

Points are awarded as follows in all classes

(key)

Notes

References

External links

Britcar
Britcar
Britcar Endurance Championship seasons